is a railway station in the city of Toyota, Aichi, Japan, operated by Meitetsu.

Lines
Koshido Station is served by the Meitetsu Mikawa Line and is 19.1 kilometers from the terminus of the line at Chiryū Station.

Station layout
The station has two opposed elevated side platforms with the station building underneath. The station has automated ticket machines, Manaca automated turnstiles and is staffed.

Platforms

Adjacent stations

|-
!colspan=5|Nagoya Railroad

Station history
Koshido Station was opened on January 17, 1922, as a station on the privately owned Mikawa Railway. The Mikawa Railway was merged with Meitetsu on June 1, 1941. The station has been unattended since 1970. The tracks were elevated in December 2000 and a new station building was completed at that time.

Passenger statistics
In fiscal 2017, the station was used by an average of 897 passengers daily.

Surrounding area
 Japan National Route 153
 site of Koshido mines

See also
 List of Railway Stations in Japan

References

External links

 Official web page 

Railway stations in Japan opened in 1922
Railway stations in Aichi Prefecture
Stations of Nagoya Railroad
Toyota, Aichi